The official language of Ukraine is Ukrainian, an East Slavic language, which is the native language of 67.5% of Ukraine's population. Ethnologue lists 40 minority languages and dialects; nearly all are native to the former Soviet Union.
As a result of legislation entitled the 'Bill on the principles of the state language policy" from 2012, languages spoken by at least 10% of an oblast's population were made possible to be elevated to the status of 'regional language'. However, in 2014 the Constitutional Court of Ukraine started reviewing the constitutionality of the law, and on 28 February 2018 it ruled the law unconstitutional and the law was abolished.

Language and daily life

According to the first (and so far only) population census of 2001, ethnic Ukrainians make up 77.8% of the population. Other ethnic groups are Russians (17.3%), Belarusians (0.6%), Moldovans (0.5%), Crimean Tatars (0.5%), Bulgarians (0.4%), Hungarians (0.3%), Romanians (0.3%), Poles (0.3%), Jews (0.2%), Armenians (0.2%), Greeks (0.2%), Karaites (>0.1%), Krymchaks (>0.1%) and Gagauzes (0.1%).

In an 11–23 December 2015 study by the Razumkov Centre taken in all regions of Ukraine other than Russian-annexed Crimea, and separatist controlled Donetsk, and Luhansk, a majority considered Ukrainian their native language (60%), followed by Russian (15%), while 22% used both languages equally. Two percent had another native language. For the preferred language of work, an equal amount chose either Ukrainian or Russian (37%) and 21% communicated bilingually. The study polled 10,071 individuals and held a 1% margin of error.

Past polling
In an October 2009 poll by a pro-Russian political sociology company FOM-Ukraine of 1,000 respondents, 52% stated they use Russian as their "Language of communication"; while 41% of the respondents state they use Ukrainian and 8% stated they use a mixture of both.

A March 2010 poll by Research & Branding Group showed that 65% considered Ukrainian as their native language and 33% Russian. This poll also showed the standard of knowledge of the Russian language (free conversational language, writing and reading) in current Ukraine is higher (76%) than the standard of knowledge of the Ukrainian language (69%). More respondents preferred to speak Ukrainian (46%) than Russian (38%) with 16% preferring to speak both in equal manner.

A poll held November 2009 revealed that 54.7% of the population of Ukraine believed the language issue in Ukraine was irrelevant, that each person could speak the language they preferred and that a lot more important problems existed in the country; 14.7% of those polled stated that the language issue was an urgent problem that could not be postponed and that calls for immediate resolution; another 28.3% believed that, while the language issue needed to be resolved, this could be postponed.

An August 2011 poll by Razumkov Centre showed that 53.3% of the respondents use the Ukrainian language in everyday life, while 44.5% use Russian.

In a May 2012 poll by RATING, 50% of respondents considered Ukrainian their native language, 29% Russian, 20% consider both Ukrainian and Russian their mother tongue and 1% considered a different language their native language.

Current languages 
The following table gives the native languages (but not necessarily the languages spoken at home) with their number of speakers according to the 2001 Ukrainian Census:

The varieties of Romani represented are Vlax, Carpathian and Balkan. There are also speakers of the Gammalsvenska dialect of Swedish (at least 10 fluent and perhaps 150 with some knowledge as of 2014).

Regional languages 

As a result of legislation entitled the 'Bill on the principles of the state language policy", which was adopted by the Verkhovna Rada in August 2012, languages spoken by at least 10% of an oblast's population were made possible to be elevated to the status of 'regional language'. Whilst Ukrainian remained the country's only 'official' language nationwide, other languages, dependent on their adoption by oblast authorities, became accepted mediums of communication in education, local government offices, courts and official correspondence. 

In February 2014, the Verkhovna Rada abolished the law on regional languages. In spite of this, then Acting President Oleksandr Turchynov refused to sign this decision. In October 2014 the Constitutional Court of Ukraine started reviewing the constitutionality of the law, and on 28 February 2018 it ruled the law unconstitutional. According to the Council of Europe, this act fails to achieve fair protection of the linguistic rights of minorities.

Foreign languages 
English is the primary foreign language taught in Ukraine. According to online polls, as many as 50% of Ukrainians can speak English.

Historical facts

According to the Russian Imperial Census of 1897 on the territory of the nine Russian Governorates in modern Ukraine yielded the following results:

List of Mentioned Regions 
Chernigov Governorate
Kharkov Governorate
Kherson Governorate
Kiev Governorate
Podolia Governorate
Poltava Governorate
Taurida Governorate
Volyn Governorate
Yekaterinoslav Governorate

Maps

All-Ukraine

Crimea

Language policy 

In November 2016, a new rule came into force requiring Ukraine's radio stations to play a quota of Ukrainian-language songs each day. The law also requires TV and radio broadcasters to ensure 60% of programs such as news and analysis are in Ukrainian.

In September 2017, Ukraine instituted a similar policy on languages in public education. The law required that schools use Ukrainian, the national language, in all classes that did not require a second language. The exception from this being language classes that would be taught using "English or other official languages of the European Union."
The new spelling version was adopted by the Cabinet of Ministers of Ukraine in May 2019.

See also
Ukrainian language
Demographics of Ukraine
Russian language in Ukraine
Russification of Ukraine

References

Bibliography

Linguistic composition of the population, according to the Ukrainian census of 2001
Languages of Ukraine by Ethnologue
Суржик - проблема української мови
Ukrainian-zone.com - learn Ukrainian online

 
Society of Ukraine
Ukrainian culture